Aroona is a suburb of Caloundra in the Sunshine Coast Region, Queensland, Australia.

Geography 

History
Aroona is an Aboriginal word meaning "place of refreshing" or "place of running water".

The median age of the Aroona population was 43 years, 5 years above the national median of 38, with 79% of people born in Australia. The other top responses for country of birth were England 5.6%, New Zealand 4.4%, Scotland 0.7%, South Africa 0.6% and Netherlands 0.5%. 93.5% of people spoke only English at home; the next most common languages were 0.5% German, 0.3% Dutch, 0.3% Swedish, 0.3% Italian, 0.2% Dari.

Education
There are no schools in Aroona. The nearest primary schools are in neighbouring Currimundi, Caloundra and Meridan Plains. The nearest secondary schools are in Caloundra and Meridan Plains.

Facilities 
Sugarbag Road Reservoir is a water treatment plant.

Amenities 
There are a number of parks in Aroona:

 Aroona Park
 Bapaume Park
 Juno Park
 Kalana Park
 Kalana Road Buffer
 Kestrel Park
 Michael Olm Park
 Nicklin Way Buffer 7
 Ocean Ridge Park
 Ridgehaven Natural Amenity Reserve
 Ridgehaven Park
 Rothfall Chase Reserve
 Sharyn Bonney Bushland Reserve

References

Suburbs of the Sunshine Coast Region
Caloundra